Firstrade Securities is a stockbrokerage firm and broker-dealer headquartered in Flushing, New York that offers an electronic trading platform to trade financial assets including stocks, exchange-traded funds  (ETF), options, mutual funds, and bonds.

In May 2022, Firstrade Securities launched its cryptocurrency platform through Firstrade Crypto LLC.

History
The company was founded in 1985 by John Liu, as First Flushing Securities.

In 1997, the company was renamed to Firstrade Securities Inc., and the company launched Firstrade.com.

In April 2010, Taifook Securities Company Limited, a wholly owned subsidiary of TSG, signed an agreement with Firstrade Securities, a US online broker, for cross-border securities trading business. Firstrade Securities no longer works with Taifook Securities Company Limited.

Firstrade held its branch grand opening on August 15, 2014.

Firstrade has been recognized as a best online broker by Kiplinger's Personal Finance since 2018, cited as best for active traders, funds, customer service, ETFs, and other categories

References

External links
 

1985 establishments in New York City
Investment management companies of the United States
Companies based in Queens, New York
Flushing, Queens
American companies established in 1985
Financial services companies established in 1985
Financial services companies of the United States
Companies based in New York City
Online brokerages